Jeffery Deon Estus (July 4, 1956 – October 11, 2021) was an American musician and singer, best known as the bass player of Wham! and as the bassist on George Michael's first two solo projects.  Estus' single "Heaven Help Me", with additional vocals by George Michael, reached No. 5 on the Billboard Hot 100 chart in 1989.

Early life
Estus was born in Detroit on July 4, 1956.  He went to Northwestern High School.  There, he sang second tenor in the choir under the direction of Brazel Dennard.  His bass guitar teacher was James Jamerson of Motown's the Funk Brothers.

Career
Estus joined the R&B band Brainstorm as a teenager, recording two albums with them and scoring a hit with "Popcorn". During the early 1980s, he moved to Europe to join and tour with Marvin Gaye. He lived in Belgium and Ireland, before settling in London. He turned down the chance to play bass on Marvin Gaye's 1982 comeback album, Midnight Love, because he was so busy recording and he said that he was not aware that it would be the last album released during Gaye's lifetime.  After his bass talents were recognized, he was invited to join the UK pop group, Wham!.  He went on to tour China with Wham! and later backed Wham! frontman George Michael on his Faith tour.  He also participated in the late-1980s collective Boogie Box High, which was spearheaded by George Michael's cousin, Andros Georgiou, and featured George Michael along with other high-profile musicians; Estus appears on the group's only album, Outrageous, released in 1989.  Estus later performed with George Michael at Rock in Rio and continued to play bass as part of his backing band until George Michael's death in 2016.

In 1989, Estus released a solo album entitled Spell, produced by Colin Campsie and George McFarlane, with several tracks produced by George Michael.  Released before the album, the single "Me or the Rumours" reached No. 15 on Billboard's Hot Dance Music/Club Play chart in 1988.  In 1989, the album's title track hit No. 11 on the Adult Contemporary chart. However, the album's biggest hit was the No. 5 Billboard Hot 100 single "Heaven Help Me", for which George Michael supplied backing vocals.  It also peaked at No. 3 on both the Adult Contemporary and Hot R&B charts.  The album itself ultimately reached No. 89 on the Billboard 200 and No. 44 on the Top R&B Albums chart.

Estus also played with Tina Turner, Frank Zappa, George Clinton, Annie Lennox, Edgar Winter, Aaron Neville, and Elton John.  In recent years, Estus was the featured bass player for the R&B band, Switch.

Personal life
Estus was married, in his twenties, to Olga Johnson. This union produced one daughter and three grandchildren. Divorced in the mid-1980s, he remained single, until his death.  Estus died on October 11, 2021, at the age of 65.

Discography

Albums

Singles

References

External links

 

1956 births
2021 deaths
American rock bass guitarists
American session musicians
Wham! members
American rhythm and blues bass guitarists
American expatriates in Belgium
American expatriates in Ireland
American expatriates in England
Guitarists from Detroit
American male bass guitarists
20th-century American bass guitarists
20th-century American male musicians
Boogie Box High members
Geffen Records artists
PolyGram artists
Polydor Records artists